"Someone to Love" is a song by English actor and singer Sean Maguire, released as his first single in 1994. It reached number 14 and spent seven weeks in the UK Singles Chart.

Track listing
 "Someone to Love"
 "Devotion"
 "Someone to Love" (P's R&B dub)
 "Someone to Love" (P's dub mix)

References

1994 debut singles
1994 songs
Parlophone singles
Sean Maguire songs